St. Joseph Seminary, Maliana, in Maliana Diocese, East Timor, is the country's second Catholic minor seminary.

In 2010, the Major Seminary of St. Peter and Paul in Dili was struggling to cope with the 126 seminarians who were studying for the priesthood. The country's only minor seminary, the Seminary of Our Lady of Fatima was also struggling to accommodate the growing number of candidates desiring to enter the priesthood. This led to the plan to build a second minor seminary.

The Apostolic Nuncio Archbishop Joseph Salvador Marino, Bishop Norberto do Amaral of Maliana and Bishop Basilio do Nascimento of Baucau were present during the opening of the Seminary on September 26, 2017.

Father Pascoal dos Santos Marques is the first rector of the seminary. 22 students have already been admitted for study to the priesthood.

The seminary did not get a new building but will occupy a renovated building belonging to the Colegio Infante de Sagres.

References

Maliana
Catholic seminaries
Catholic Church in East Timor
Educational institutions established in 2017
2017 establishments in East Timor